Love Me Forever may refer to:
 Love Me Forever (film), a 1935 American drama film
 "Love Me Forever" (song), a 1957 song by the Four Esquires
 Love Me Forever (Motörhead), a 1991 song by the British band Motörhead on their album 1916
 Love Me Forever (album), a 1963 album by Wanda Jackson
 "Love Me Forever", a song by Lil Yachty from the album Lil Boat 2